WLOY (660 AM) is an adult standards-formatted broadcast radio station licensed to Rural Retreat, Virginia, serving the Wytheville and Marion area.  WLOY is owned and operated by Three Rivers Media.

History
Until July 23, 2007, WLOY had been silent since its sale to Three Rivers Media from Ora Robert Smallwood on October 17, 2006.

On September 17, 2008, WLOY switched from Contemporary Christian to talk, dropping its affiliation with Salem's "Today's Christian Music" Network.  In late August 2013, WLOY dropped its talk format for adult standards, branding as "Virginia Style 660".  The branding switched to "Classic 660 WLOY" in late 2014, while the format remained the same.

References

External links
Classic 660 WLOY Online

LOY
Radio stations established in 1985
Adult standards radio stations in the United States
1985 establishments in Virginia
LOY